None but the Lonely Heart may refer to:

 "None but the Lonely Heart" (Tchaikovsky), a musical setting by Pyotr Ilyich Tchaikovsky of a Russian translation of Johann Wolfgang von Goethe's poem "Nur wer die Sehnsucht kennt", published in 1869
 None but the Lonely Heart (novel), by Richard Llewellyn (1943)
 None but the Lonely Heart (film), a 1944 movie based on the novel starring Cary Grant, Ethel Barrymore and Barry Fitzgerald
 None but the Lonely Heart (album), a 1997 album by pianist Chris Anderson and bassist Charlie Haden